The Higalaay Festival (formerly known as Kagay-an Festival, then to Higalaay Kagay-an Festival in 2014) is a patronal festival held each year in Cagayan de Oro, Philippines, every 28th day of August, celebrating the feast day of St. Augustine – patron saint of the city.

Etymology 
Higalaay Festival means "Friendship Festival", which the word "Higalaay" comes from the Cebuano word "higala" (friend; chum; pal) which was regarded from what the city of Cagayan de Oro is being tagged, the City of Golden Friendship.

History 
Under father Pedro de Santa Barbara, they built the first Christian church near the fort (Gaston Park before). Coincidentally, it was finished on August 28, 1780 – the feast of St. Augustine. Since then, the inhabitants celebrate August 28 as the feast of the settlement. As years pass by, the city's festival has been changing identities as the administration changes, before, Cagayan de Oro's festival was popularly known as Kagay-an Festival and now called Higalaay Festival.

Events 
It has been the tradition of the city of Cagayan de Oro to celebrate its festivity with simultaneous events that even start on the first week of August. To name just some are the Garden Show and Agri Fair, Kumbira Culinary Show, Cowboy Festival: Annual Horse Show, Kahimunan Northern Mindanao: Food and Lifestyle Show, Miss Cagayan de Oro, The Kagay-an Festival Marathon, Cagayan de Oro Carnival Parade, The Higalas Parade of Floats and Icons, Higalaay Bisperas Fireworks Display, Religious Procession, Fluvial Procession, and Higalaay Pyrolympics. The highlights of the Higalaay Festival are the following:
The Kumbira Culinary Show which is now regarded as the longest running annual culinary show and festival in the whole Philippines, is a 3-day event that encompasses live competitions such as Buffet Table Setting and Manu Folder, Noche Buena Platter, Artistic Bread Showpiece, Dessert Making, Chef Wars, Flair Bartending Tandem, and other live competitions.
The Cagayan de Oro Carnival Parade is the city's street dancing competition where any of the barangays within the city can participate to compete for winning the Best Carnival Parade with their respective Carnival Queens.
The Higalas Parade of Floats and Icons, usually being participated among the city's educational institutions, civic groups, fraternities and sororities, establishments and more, is being viewed by thousands of Kagay-anons and tourists that crowd the sides of the parade's route. Drum and Bugle corps, competing floats and Cagayan de Oro icons are being paraded on the event.
The Fluvial Procession
The Higalaay Pyrolympics that is annually hosted by SM City Cagayan de Oro gather Kagay-anons and tourists for a spectacular fireworks display.

Carnival Parade Winners

See also 
Cagayan de Oro
Misamis Oriental
List of Philippine-related topics

References

External links 
Cagayan de Oro's official website

Patronal festivals in the Philippines
Tourist attractions in Cagayan de Oro
Culture of Misamis Oriental